Have Some Fun: Live at Ungano's is a live album by the rock band The Stooges. It was originally recorded on August 17, 1970 as an audience recording by Danny Fields, who had signed the band in 1968.

History
After a performance at the Goose Lake Music Festival, at which he was inebriated and unable to play properly, original bassist Dave Alexander,was replaced by  roadie Zeke Zettner.  A short while later Billy Cheatham, who was the band's road manager at the time as well as a former bandmate of Asheton's, joined on rhythm guitar. With the new line-up, they scheduled three nights at a Manhattan club called Ungano's to celebrate their new album, Fun House, being released the previous month. Danny Fields, who signed the band, was in the audience and recorded their set on the opening night, which included most of the songs from their new album and a new composition titled Have Some Fun. According to eye-witnesses, the club was packed that night and included the attendance of jazz musician Miles Davis and blues guitarist Johnny Winter. Afterwards, Davis said that "the Stooges are original, they've got spirit.” Later that night the Stooges took the stage again around 2:35 AM, and played a briefer set considering the club closed at 3:00. The group started jamming while Iggy sat on the stage floor and began telling the story of his childhood, lamenting about being ignored, and misunderstood.

Track list

Original studio versions of tracks 2–7 are available on The Stooges' second (studio) album Fun House released on July 7, 1970.

Personnel
Iggy Pop – vocals
Scott Asheton – drums
Ron Asheton – lead guitar
Bill Cheatham – rhythm guitar
Zeke Zettner – bass
Steve Mackay – tenor saxophone

References

2010 live albums
The Stooges albums
Rhino Records live albums